Duckworth v. Eagan, 492 U.S. 195 (1989), was a United States Supreme Court case dealing with police behavior when issuing the Miranda warning. The Court's decision was seen as weakening Miranda's protections.

Background 
After being questioned in regards to the stabbing of a woman, Gary Eagan was improperly read his Miranda Rights when police told him that he would be provided a lawyer "if and when you go to court." During the police investigation, Eagan did not make any incriminating statements, and waived his Miranda rights. The next day, Eagan was questioned again by police, and signed a waiver with the correct Miranda language. During the interrogation, Eagan confessed to the stabbing of the woman and revealed physical evidence of the crime committed.  Later, Eagan claimed that the difference between the language in the first waiver he signed, and the second waiver he signed, made his confession inadmissible in a court of law.

Opinion of the Court 
Chief Justice Rehnquist wrote the opinion for the Court.
The Supreme Court held that it was not necessary that the warnings be given in the exact form described in the Miranda decision, provided the warnings as a whole fully informed the suspect of his or her rights.

References

Further reading

External links
 
 Duckworth v. Eagan: A semantical debate or the continuing debasement of Miranda?

History of law enforcement in the United States
Miranda warning case law
1989 in United States case law
United States Supreme Court cases
United States Supreme Court cases of the Rehnquist Court